The men's 800 metre freestyle event at the 2018 Asian Games took place on 20 August at the Gelora Bung Karno Aquatic Stadium.

Schedule
All times are Western Indonesia Time (UTC+07:00)

Records

Results

References

Swimming at the 2018 Asian Games